Jenn Gambatese (born September 10, 1975) is an American actress and singer. Gambatese has performed in the musical production of Disney's Tarzan as Jane. Gambatese also played Glinda on the first National Tour of Wicked.

Early life and education
Gambatese was born in Philadelphia, Mississippi, and grew up in Richmond Heights, a suburb of Cleveland. Her passion for acting began during the summer of fourth grade at the Willoughby Fine Arts Center where she attended theater classes. Her first performance was "playing a 'whitewasher'" in the story of Tom Sawyer. She continued taking acting classes, and in her senior year of high school attended Beck Center as well as Cleveland State University. In 1993 she moved to Manhattan, where she enrolled in the drama department at New York University Tisch School of the Arts. She graduated in 1997 with a double major in sociology and drama and received an "Artist & Scholar" award. After graduation her first professional job was performing with Theatre for Young Audiences, a touring children's theater company. She played Serena Katz in the North American Tour of Fame with Gavin Creel as Nick Piazza. She also played the role in a European Tour of the show.

Theatre credits

Broadway performances
Gambatese made her Broadway debut in Footloose in October 1998. She played the role of Urleen and also as an understudy to the female lead actress. "Footloose" was directed by Walter Bobbie and ran on Broadway from October 2, 1998 through July 2, 2000. Gambatese followed "Footloose" with the musical Hairspray, directed by Jack O’Brien that ran on Broadway from August 2002 through January 2009. She played the role of Penny Pingleton. In April 2003, Gambatese appeared in a new Broadway musical, A Year with Frog and Toad, directed by David Petrarca; Gambatese played several roles: Bird, Mouse, Squirrel, and Young Frog. In March 2005, Gambatese played the role of Natalie Haller in the musical All Shook Up, directed by Christopher Ashley. In 2006, Gambetese played "Jane" in Tarzan, which played on Broadway from May 2006 through July 2007 at the Richard Rodgers Theatre. Next, Gambatese played Marie Leroux in "Is He Dead," a play by Mark Twain adapted by David Ives and directed by Michael Blakemore, that opened at the Lyceum Theatre in December 2007.

On August 9, 2016, she succeeded Sierra Boggess as Principal Rosalie Mullins in the Broadway production of School of Rock.

Other stage
Gambatese played Annie Oakley in the Goodspeed Musicals, East Haddam, Connecticut, production of Annie Get Your Gun from April 16 to June 27, 2010.

Television and film
 Played "Woman in Bar" in Robert De Niro's The Good Shepherd, but her part was edited out of the final cut
 All My Children in 2005 as herself
 Featured on the cast recordings of Broadway musicals Tarzan and All Shook Up, which are currently on iTunes

Personal life
She married Curtis Cregan, who was a member of a children’s television show Hi-5 and also a Broadway performer. They wed in June 2007. In January 2009, it was announced that she and her husband were expecting their first child together in May 2009. On May 12, 2009, they welcomed a daughter, Josephine. She likes to keep active by practicing yoga and bike riding as well as playing on the field as second base with her Broadway Show League.

When she is not in Manhattan she likes to spend time with her family in their home in the Catskill Mountains.

She is good friends with actress/singer Shoshana Bean.

References

External links
 
 
 

American musical theatre actresses
American women singers
Living people
American stage actresses
American people of Italian descent
1975 births
Musicians from Cleveland
Actresses from Cleveland
21st-century American women